Dichagyris proclivis is a species of cutworm or dart moth in the family Noctuidae.

The MONA or Hodges number for Dichagyris proclivis is 10871.

References

Further reading

 
 
 

proclivis
Articles created by Qbugbot
Moths described in 1888